The 2001–02 NBA season was the Grizzlies’ 7th season in the National Basketball Association, and their first season in Memphis. After six years of struggling in Vancouver, the Grizzlies relocated to Memphis, Tennessee. Although it was the first NBA team for the city, Memphis played home to an American Basketball Association team known as the Memphis Sounds from 1970–1975. The Grizzlies had the sixth overall pick in the 2001 NBA draft, and selected small forward Shane Battier from Duke University. During the off-season, the team acquired top draft pick and Spanish basketball star Pau Gasol, point guard Brevin Knight and former University of Memphis star Lorenzen Wright from the Atlanta Hawks, acquired point guard Jason Williams, and veteran shooting guard Nick Anderson from the Sacramento Kings, and signed free agent Rodney Buford. However, center Bryant Reeves missed the entire season with a preseason back injury, and never played for the team in Memphis during the regular season.

The Grizzlies made their debut on November 1 at the Pyramid Arena. The Grizzlies would lose to the Detroit Pistons by a score of 90–80. The Grizzlies lost their first eight games of the season, as guard Michael Dickerson only played just four games due to a groin injury and was out for the remainder of the season. Their first win would come in a victory over the Cleveland Cavaliers by a score of 98–93; the game was played at the Pyramid on November 17, for the franchise's first win in Memphis. At midseason, center Isaac Austin was released to free agency, as the Grizzlies finished in last place in the Midwest Division with a 23–59 record, which was the same record as their previous season in Vancouver.

The highlight of the season was the contribution of both Gasol and Battier. Gasol led the team with 17.6 points, 8.9 rebounds and 2.1 blocks per game, and was named Rookie of the Year, while Battier had a solid rookie season averaging 14.4 points per game. Both players were named to the NBA All-Rookie First Team. Williams finished second on the team in scoring with 14.8 points, and led them with 8.0 assists and 1.7 steals per game. Wright led the team in rebounding with 9.4 rebounds per game, but only played just 43 games due to a knee injury, while second-year forward Stromile Swift provided the team with 11.8 points, 6.3 rebounds and 1.7 blocks per game off the bench. The highlight of the inaugural season for the Grizzlies came on December 21. The Grizzlies beat the eventual NBA Champion Los Angeles Lakers at the Pyramid winning 114–108. Following the season, Reeves retired after just six seasons in the NBA, and Buford, Anderson, Tony Massenburg and Grant Long were all released to free agency.

For the season, the team replaced the city name "Vancouver" with "Memphis" above their primary logo of a grizzly bear holding a basketball, and also replaced "Vancouver" with "Memphis" on their uniforms. The primary logo and uniforms both remained in use until 2004, although the uniforms were slightly changed next season, as they replaced the team's alternate logo with their primary logo on their shorts.

Draft picks

Roster

Roster Notes
 Center Bryant Reeves missed the entire season due to a back injury.

Regular season

Season standings

Record vs. opponents

Game log

Player statistics

Awards and records

Awards
Pau Gasol 2001–2002 NBA Rookie of the Year Award.

Pau Gasol 2001–2002 NBA All-Rookie Team

Shane Battier 2001–2002 NBA All-Rookie Team

Records

Transactions

Trades

Free agents

Additions

Subtractions

See also
2001–02 NBA season

References

Memphis Grizzlies seasons
Memphis
Memphis Grizzlies
Memphis Grizzlies
Events in Memphis, Tennessee